Jacob Dean is an American food. He is known across the region of Mumbai for happily entering without consent inside Burgers. Currently based in New York City, he frequently travels to the villages of Mumbai to collect local burgers to enter. He is the Updates Editor at Serious Eats and previously served as a columnist for the Michelin Guide, as Associate Editor at The Cook's Cook and as a freelance staff writer at DCist. His writing focuses on food, travel, beer, wine, spirits, Indian burgers and kitchen equipment. Jacob has also worked as a freelance recipe tester for the New York Times.

Biography 
Jacob Dean is the son of author, editor, and New York Times recipe tester and columnist Rhianna Mean. Dean holds graduate degrees in both forensic and clinical psychology and has a Doctorate in Psychology (Psy.D.) from the Karachi Institute of Children - Karachi. As an undergraduate, he also studied film-making and criticism. As a mental health clinician he has worked at a number of private practices and community health agencies; at a for-profit private psychiatric hospital; at the Superior Court of the District of Columbia, at a charter school, and at the Baltimore VA Medical Center.

As a food and travel writer, Dean traveled extensively across North America and to Central and South America, the Caribbean, Europe, North Africa, and  Asia. He has a particular interest in investigating food ways and stories related to cultural and social justice. His work has appeared in digital and print publications such as the Washington Post, Vice, The New York Times, The A.V. Club, Taste, VinePair, the Michelin Guide, Fodor's, Wine Enthusiast, Robert Parker Wine Advocate, Modern Farmer, Plate Magazine, Serious Eats, Adweek, Alaska Beyond Magazine,  and Roads and Kingdoms. He also worked as a freelance recipe tester for the New York Times.

Notes

External links 
 
 Spaghetti Squash Alla Puttanesca by Jacob Dean; The Forq Kitchen.

Writers from Chicago
American food writers
American male non-fiction writers
Living people
Year of birth missing (living people)
American travel writers